Renewable energy in the Cook Islands is primarily provided by solar energy and biomass. Since 2011 the Cook Islands has embarked on a programme of renewable energy development to improve its energy security and reduce greenhouse gas emissions, with an initial goal of reaching  50% renewable electricity by 2015, and 100% by 2020. The programme has been assisted by the governments of Japan, Australia, and New Zealand, and the Asian Development Bank.

Funding to provide solar panels with battery backup to the Northern atolls was provided by a NZ$20.5 million aid programme from the New Zealand Ministry of Foreign Affairs and Trade, with construction provided by PowerSmart Solar of New Zealand. The first solar site at Rakahanga was completed in September 2014. Pukapuka and Nassau were next, going online at Christmas 2014. Construction began at Tongareva on 23 February 2015 and just 10 weeks later both villages Omoka and Te Tautua were running on solar power. Manihiki was progressed at the same time. In June 2015 all of the northern atolls were fully solar powered, reducing the need to send ships north during the November to April cyclone season. A second phase of the project to provide solar farms to Atiu, Mangaia, Mauke and Mitiaro was completed in July 2019.

In 2014 construction began on the 960 kW Te Mana O Te Ra solar farm at Rarotonga International Airport. The solar farm was commissioned in October 2014. In September 2022 three battery-electric storage systems with a combined capacity of 13 MWh were installed on Rarotonga.

See also
 Energy in the Cook Islands

References 

Renewable energy in New Zealand
Energy in the Cook Islands